Graceville Township is a township in Big Stone County, Minnesota, United States. The population was 205 as of the 2000 census. Graceville Township took its name from the city of Graceville, which was named for Thomas Langdon Grace, second Roman Catholic Bishop of Saint Paul, Minnesota.

Geography

The city of Graceville is entirely within this township geographically but is a separate entity.

Unincorporated town
 Big Stone Colony at 
(This list is based on USGS data and may include former settlements.)

Major highways
  U.S. Route 75
  Minnesota State Highway 28

Lakes
 E Toqua Lake
 Lannon Lake
 Lake Leo
 S Rothwell Lake (north edge)
 Smithwicks Lake
 W Toqua Lake

Adjacent townships
 Tara Township, Traverse County (north)
 Leonardsville Township, Traverse County (northeast)
 Moonshine Township (east)
 Malta Township (southeast)
 Almond Township (south)
 Prior Township (southwest)
 Toqua Township (west)

Cemeteries
The township contains these two cemeteries: Big Stone Hutterite Colony and Graceville.

Demographics
As of the census of 2000, there were 205 people, 54 households, and 48 families residing in the township.  The population density was 6.2 people per square mile (2.4/km).  There were 62 housing units at an average density of 1.9/sq mi (0.7/km).  The racial makeup of the township was 100.00% White.

There were 54 households, out of which 48.1% had children under the age of 18 living with them, 88.9% were married couples living together, and 9.3% were non-families. 9.3% of all households were made up of individuals, and 7.4% had someone living alone who was 65 years of age or older.  The average household size was 3.80 and the average family size was 4.08.

In the township the population was spread out, with 39.5% under the age of 18, 8.8% from 18 to 24, 22.4% from 25 to 44, 19.0% from 45 to 64, and 10.2% who were 65 years of age or older.  The median age was 26 years. For every 100 females, there were 89.8 males.  For every 100 females age 18 and over, there were 103.3 males.

The median income for a household in the township was $25,833, and the median income for a family was $24,750. Males had a median income of $25,625 versus $23,750 for females. The per capita income for the township was $7,826.  About 36.4% of families and 43.9% of the population were below the poverty line, including 50.6% of those under the age of eighteen and none of those 65 or over.

References
 United States National Atlas
 United States Census Bureau 2007 TIGER/Line Shapefiles
 United States Board on Geographic Names (GNIS)

Townships in Big Stone County, Minnesota
Townships in Minnesota